Marcel·lí Massana Bancells (1918–1981) was an anarchist guerrilla among the most famed maquis in Catalonia.

Early life and career 

Marcel·lí Massana Bancells was born in Berga in 1918. Massana participated in the Confederación Nacional del Trabajo and was a Republican lieutenant during the Spanish Civil War. Jailed between 1939 and 1942, Massana fled to France, but returned to Catalonia as an anarchist guerrilla maquis in 1944, in which he was a famed figure and known as "Poncho". He and Caracremada carried out kidnappings, attacks, and expropriations in Berguedà and Solsonès. He quit his career as a maquis in 1951 and returned to France. Massana died in the country's Foix region in 1981.

References

Bibliography 

 
 

1918 births
1981 deaths
Spanish anarchists
Spanish maquis
Confederación Nacional del Trabajo members
People from Foix
People from Berguedà
Spanish anti-fascists
Spanish expatriates in France